The 2014–15 season was Newport County's second consecutive season in Football League Two, 62nd season in the Football League and 94th season of league football overall. They finished the season in 9th place, narrowly missing out on the play-offs.

Season Review

League
The season started with three straight league defeats, including a 3–2 defeat at Morecambe where County were leading 2–0 at half time. However, with Newport lying just outside the relegation places they entered a run of form that saw them lose just two more games in the first half of the season. Highlights included home wins over Northampton Town, AFC Wimbledon, York City, Southend United, Stevenage and Plymouth Argyle; and away wins at Portsmouth, Dagenham & Redbridge, Bury, Carlisle United and Cheltenham Town. At the halfway point in the season County were in the play-off positions in 5th place, just three points from an automatic promotion spot.

In the new year, the good results kept coming: Home wins over Carlisle and Portsmouth put County in third place. However, there was speculation that County's success had led to interest in manager Justin Edinburgh from other clubs. There had been approaches in the previous season: On 2 December 2013, County rejected an approach from Edinburgh's former club Portsmouth to be interviewed as a successor to Guy Whittingham as Portsmouth manager. In January 2014 Edinburgh stated he had rebuffed an unofficial approach directly to himself to be considered as manager of Northampton Town Following the win over Portsmouth, County had now lost three games in a row, as the speculation about Edinburgh's future grew. On 3 February Gillingham made an official approach, and on 7 February he was announced as the new Gills' boss. His departure was confirmed just two hours before kick-off at AFC Wimbledon and, under caretaker manager Jimmy Dack, County slipped to a fourth successive defeat. County halted a run of four straight defeats with a 1–1 draw against Tranmere Rovers in Dack's first home game in charge. Despite the poor run of form Newport were still within the play-off positions, in 6th place. However, with only five more wins in the remaining 16 games, County slipped out of the play-off places, eventually finishing 9th.

Results summary

Results by round

League table

Squad statistics

Squad information
Caps and goals as at 10 May 2015 as per Soccerbase.

Transfers

In

Out

Loans in

Loans out

Managerial statistics 
Only competitive games from the 2014–15 season are included.

Match details

Pre-season friendlies

League Two

Football League Cup

Football League Trophy

FA Cup

External links
 Newport County AFC 2014-2015 : Results
 Newport County's results from season 2014/2015

References

2014-15
2014–15 Football League Two by team
Welsh football clubs 2014–15 season